Bernard James Dwyer (January 24, 1921 – October 31, 1998) was an American politician who served as a United States representative from New Jersey from 1981 to 1993.

Early life and education
Dwyer was born in Perth Amboy, Middlesex County, New Jersey, to Daniel F. and Alice (Zehrer) Dwyer. A Roman Catholic, he attended public schools, graduating from Perth Amboy High School in 1938. He attended Rutgers University–Newark, but did not earn a degree. He served in the United States Navy during World War II (1940–1945).

Career 
Dwyer was an insurance broker by profession. His political career began when he successfully ran for a seat on the Edison, New Jersey city council, serving 1958–1969. He was elected Mayor of Edison, New Jersey in 1969, serving a single term from 1970 to 1973. Dwyer served as a member of the New Jersey Senate, where he represented the 18th Legislative District (New Jersey) from 1974 to 1980.

He was elected to the United States House of Representatives, and served six terms (January 3, 1981 – January 3, 1993).

Dwyer was the last member of Congress who was also a survivor of the Japanese Attack on Pearl Harbor, when he retired in 1992.

Dwyer did not seek reelection in 1992, and retired in 1993. Redistricting after the 1990 Census had merged his district with that of fellow Democrat Frank Pallone.

Dwyer's congressional papers are stored at the Rutgers University Libraries, Special Collections and University Archives in New Brunswick, New Jersey. They include congressional office files consisting chiefly of documentation accumulated while he was a member of the United States House Committee on Appropriations.

Personal life 
He married Lilyan Sudzina in 1944. They had one daughter, Pamela Dwyer Stockton.

A resident of Metuchen, New Jersey, Dwyer died at John F. Kennedy Medical Center in Edison, New Jersey on October 31, 1998, of a heart attack. He was buried at St. Gertrude's Cemetery in Colonia, New Jersey.

References

External links

 Bernard James Dwyer at The Political Graveyard
 
 "Bernard James Dwyer." Marquis Who's Who TM. Marquis Who's Who, 2009.  Reproduced in Biography Resource Center. Farmington Hills, Michigan: Gale, 2009. http://galenet.galegroup.com/servlet/BioRC.  Document Number: K2016524728.  Fee.  Accessed 2009-12-08 via Fairfax County Public Library.

1921 births
1998 deaths
Rutgers University alumni
Mayors of Edison, New Jersey
Democratic Party New Jersey state senators
Democratic Party members of the United States House of Representatives from New Jersey
United States Navy personnel of World War II
People from Edison, New Jersey
People from Metuchen, New Jersey
Perth Amboy High School alumni
Politicians from Perth Amboy, New Jersey
20th-century American politicians